Arteaga is a city and a Pueblo Mágico in the Mexican state of Coahuila.
It serves as the administrative centre for the surrounding municipality of the same name.

In addition to the municipal seat, it contains the settlements of San Antonio de las Alazanas, El Tunal,  San Juan de los Dolores,  Huachichil, Los Lirios, Mesa de Tablas, Bella Unión, Escobedo, and Jamé.

Arteaga residents often boast that they have a year-round median temperature of 22ºC (72ºF), and say theirs is the "most perfect" climate in North America.

The area was first inhabited by settlers from Tlaxcala in 1580, who named it San Isidro de las Palomas.
On  29 December 1866  it was renamed in honour of General José María Arteaga Magallanes, a 19th-century national hero and governor of the state of Querétaro de Arteaga.

It includes the congregation of Landeros, which was named after an American soldier of Irish descent, who after the army's march through the area in the 1840s, settled there.

References

Populated places in Coahuila
Populated places established in 1591
Pueblos Mágicos